The 1980–81 Montenegrin Republic League was 36th season of Montenegrin Republic League. Season started in August 1980 and finished in May 1981.

Season 

In Montenegrin Republic League 1980-81 participated 14 teams. Among the clubs which didn't play on previous season were three best sides from lower tier - Arsenal, Jezero and Titeks.
The title won Mogren, with five points more than Titeks

Table

Higher leagues 
On season 1980–81, four Montenegrin teams played in higher leagues of SFR Yugoslavia. Budućnost participated in 1980–81 Yugoslav First League, while three other teams (Sutjeska, OFK Titograd and Lovćen) played in 1980–81 Yugoslav Second League.

See also 
 Montenegrin Republic League
Montenegrin Republic Cup (1947–2006)
Montenegrin clubs in Yugoslav football competitions (1946–2006)
Montenegrin Football Championship (1922–1940)

References 

Montenegrin Republic League
1980–81 in Yugoslav football
1980–81 in European third tier association football leagues